This is a list of television programs currently broadcast (in first-run or reruns), scheduled to be broadcast, or formerly broadcast on Discovery Kids, a Latin American cable television channel owned by Warner Bros. Discovery. The channel was launched on November 1, 1996, and airs a mix of animated and live-action programming.

NOTE: Programming is different across feeds.

Current programming

Original programming
 Earth to Luna!

Programming from ABC Kids
 Kangaroo Beach

Programming from CBBC and CBeebies
 Art Ninja

Programming from Channel 5/Milkshake! 
 Peppa Pig

Programming from TVOKids 
 Big Top Academy

Programming from Discovery Kids/Hub Network/Discovery Family
 My Little Pony: Pony Life

Programming from Disney Channel and Playhouse Disney/Disney Junior
Ghostforce

Programming from Netflix
 Super Monsters

Programming from PBS Kids
 Curious George
 Hero Elementary

Programming from YTV and Treehouse TV
 Agent Binky: Pets of the Universe
 Super Wish

Other acquired programming

 44 Cats
 100% Wolf: Legend of the Moonstone
 The Adventures of the Boonie Bears
 Ba Da Bean The Beachbuds Cleo & Cuquin The Dog and Pony Show Dog Loves Books                
 The Enchanted Village of Pinocchio FriendZSpace Kung Fu Wa Mini Beat Power Rockers Pat the Dog Petronix Defenders             
 Pinocchio and Friends Polly Pocket               
 Presto! School of Magic Ricky Zoom S.M.A.S.H! Topo Gigio Weird Waters Underdogs UnitedUpcoming programming
 Elinor Wonders Why 50/50 Heroes Totally Spies! Droners (SAP Feed Only)

Former programming

Original programming
 FishtronautProgramming from ABC Kids
 Bananas in PyjamasProgramming from CBBC and CBeebies

 Animal Park Boo! Bob the Builder Charlie and Lola Ethelbert the Tiger Iconicles Junior MasterChef The Koala Brothers LazyTown Extra Little Red Tractor Little Robots Mike the Knight Mister Maker Mister Maker Comes to Town Mortimer and Arabel Octonauts Postman Pat Rubbadubbers Scream Street Teletubbies Teletubbies Everywhere Tree Fu Tom Wide-Eye The Worst WitchProgramming from CITV
 Albie Art Attack Bernard's Watch Construction Site Engie Benjy Fetch the Vet Gaspard and Lisa How 2 Jungle Run Mr. Men and Little Miss Pocoyo Thomas & Friends (series 1-8)
 Tiny Planets Tots TVProgramming from Channel 5/Milkshake!
 Angelina Ballerina: The Next Steps Fifi and the Flowertots Floogals Jelly Jamm Little Princess Noddy in Toyland PB Bear and Friends Roary the Racing Car Thomas & Friends (series 9-20)
 WissperProgramming from CBC Kids
 Animal Mechanicals Artzooka! Bruno and the Banana Bunch The Doozers Lunar Jim Monster Math Squad Pirates: Adventures in Art Poko The Save-Ums!Programming from TVOKids
 Annedroids Dino Dan Rob the RobotProgramming from Discovery Kids/Hub Network/Discovery Family

 The Adventures of Chuck and Friends Bindi the Jungle Girl Bingo and Molly Bonehead Detectives of the Paleoworld Hi-5 Jaws and Claws Jeff Corwin Unleashed Littlest Pet Shop Littlest Pet Shop: A World of Our Own Mega Movie Magic My Little Pony: Friendship Is Magic Outward Bound USA The Paz Show Peep and the Big Wide World Real Kids, Real Adventures Sail Away Salty's Lighthouse Sci Squad Strawberry Shortcake's Berry Bitty Adventures ToddWorld Transformers: Rescue Bots Transformers: Rescue Bots Academy Truth or Scare Ultimate Guide to the Awesome WilburProgramming from Disney Channel and Playhouse Disney/Disney Junior
 Amazing Animals The Famous Jett JacksonProgramming from Netflix
 The Adventures of Puss in Boots All Hail King Julien Dinotrux The Ponysitters Club Turbo Fast Programming from Nickelodeon and Noggin/Nick Jr. 

 The Backyardigans Franklin Franklin and Friends The Fresh Beat Band Jack's Big Music Show Julius Jr. Lalaloopsy LazyTown Miss Spider's Sunny Patch Friends Pinky Dinky Doo Play with Me Sesame Toot & Puddle Veloz Mente Winx Club Wow! Wow! Wubbzy! Zack & QuackProgramming from Pakapaka
 Puerto PapelProgramming from PBS Kids

 Barney & Friends Bert and Ernie's Great Adventures Caillou The Cat in the Hat Knows a Lot About That! Clifford the Big Red Dog Clifford's Puppy Days Dinosaur Train Dragon Tales Elmo: The Musical Elmo's World Franny's Feet Ghostwriter Global Grover It's a Big Big World Jakers! The Adventures of Piggley Winks Jay Jay the Jet Plane Kratts' Creatures Let's Go Luna! Martha Speaks Nature Cat Newton's Apple Odd Squad Peg + Cat Plaza Sésamo The Puzzle Place Sid the Science Kid Super Why! Wild Kratts Wishbone WordGirl WordWorld ZoboomafooProgramming from YTV and Treehouse TV
 Babar and the Adventures of Badou Groundling Marsh I Was a Sixth Grade Alien Incredible Story Studios Monster by Mistake Mystery Hunters ReBoot The Screech Owls Weird-Oh's Will and Dewitt Willa's Wild Life The Zack Files The ZhuZhusOther acquired programming

 3, 2, 1, Let's Go A.J.'s Time Travelers Acceso Total The Adventures of A.R.I, My Robot Friend                                                                                                                                                                                                               
 The Adventures of Rocky and Bullwinkle Albert Says... Nature Knows Best Angry Birds Blues Angry Birds Stella Angry Birds Toons Animal Bites Animal Planet Zooventure Animated Tales of the World Animated World Faiths Aquateam Banana Zoo Barbie Dreamtopia Bob in a Bottle Boonie Bears: The Adventurers The Big Garage Bookmice Calimero Charlie the Interviewer of Things Clara en Foodland Connie the Cow Cro Croc Files The Crocodile Hunter Cubeez Cyberkids The Deep Desafio All Terrain End of the World Digger and Splat Dino Aventuras Dino Detectives Dino Safari Doki D.P.A. Detetives do Prédio Azul Enchantimals Esme & Roy Fluffy Gardens Friends of Research and Odd Gadgets Going Wild with Jeff Corwin Grizzly Tales for Gruesome Kids Hanazuki: Full of Treasures Harry and His Bucket Full of Dinosaurs Helen's Little School Henry's World Hi-5 Australia Hi-5 Fiesta Hi-5 House The Insectibles Iris, The Happy Professor La Isla de Jordan Jack Hanna's Animal Adventures The Jeff Corwin Experience Jim Henson's Animal Show The Jolliest Elf Just Add Magic Justin Time Kitty Cats Kleo the Misfit Unicorn Lilybuds Little People The Little Prince Little Star Lost in Oz Louie Maggie & Bianca: Fashion Friends MasterChef Junior Mentors Mercurio Más allá de la música Las Micro-Aventuras de Tito Milly, Molly Miss Moon Monchhichi Mr. Magoo Muppet Babies My Little Pony My Little Pony Tales Mythic Warriors NaturAventura                                                                                                   
 The New Adventures of A.R.K. The New Ghostwriter Mysteries No, Really! The Ollie & Moon Show The Oz Kids Pac-Man and the Ghostly Adventures Parque Patati Patatá Peanuts Piggy Tales Ping and Friends PlayDate Poky and Friends Pop Sci Popular Mechanics for Kids Power Players Prehistoric Planet Princess of the Nile Pucca Pumper Pups ¿Qué Monstruo Te Mordió? Rainbow Ruby Religions of the World: Our Worlds Faith Rev & Roll Robot Trains Round the Twist Ruta Quetzal 
 Sadie Sparks The Strange Chores Sammy and Company Sci Q Scouts en Acción Sea Princesses Siete y yo The Secret Lair Sky Trackers S.O.S. Fada Manu Splat! Spy Academy The Storyteller The Strange Chores Sugar Skulls Super Dinosaur Super Wings Team Dronix Testament: The Bible in Animation This is Daniel Cook This is Emily Yeung Too Cute Tracey McBean Trucktown Twipsy The Ultimate Guide Ultra-Misión Vigias del Sur Vivi Walking with Dinosaurs Winnie and Wilbur Winnie the Whimsical Wisdom of the Gnomes The World of David the Gnome Zak Storm El Zoo de Zu''

See also
 List of programs broadcast by Cartoon Network (Latin America)

Notes

References

Discovery Kids
Cartoon Network-related lists